The Franz Krull Sk-class is a class of steam locomotive built by the Franz Krull metal works of Tallinn, Estonia between 1931-1940.

The Sk were narrow-gauged and used oil shale as fuel, since it is the primary energy source in Estonia. A total of 16 units were produced, of which none has survived. The last Sk, Sk-156, was scrapped in 1980 in Beloretsk, Russia, where it was actively used until scrapping.

List of Sk locomotives

Built in 1931:
Sk-151
Sk-152
Sk-153
Sk-154
Sk-155
Sk-156
Sk-157
Sk-158
Sk-159
Sk-150

Built in 1935:
Sk-160
Sk-161
Sk-162

Built in 1940:

(During the first Soviet occupation of Estonia, when the factory was renamed "Punane Krull" ("Red Krull"). These locomobiles were decorated by the red star and hammer and stickle figures.)
Sk-163
Sk-164
Sk-165

References

External links
 Mulgi Railway
 History of Estonian narrow-gauge railways (in Estonian)

Steam locomotives of Estonia
750 mm gauge locomotives
Railway locomotives introduced in 1931